The discography of Swedish singer Sanna Nielsen consists of eight studio albums. She represented Sweden at the 2014 Eurovision Song Contest in Copenhagen, Denmark, with the song "Undo", coming third in the final with 218 points.

Studio albums

Joint albums

Compilation albums

Extended plays

Singles

References

Discographies of Swedish artists